Róbert Szepessy (born 12 August 1985 in Budapest) is a Hungarian football player who currently plays for Szigetszentmiklósi TK.

References
Player profile at HLSZ 

1985 births
Living people
Footballers from Budapest
Hungarian footballers
Association football forwards
MTK Budapest FC players
Dunaújváros FC players
Soroksári TE footballers
Kaposvári Rákóczi FC players
Szolnoki MÁV FC footballers
Nemzeti Bajnokság I players